Prince Alexander Philipp Maximilian zu Wied-Neuwied (23 September 1782 – 3 February 1867) was a German explorer, ethnologist and naturalist. He led a pioneering expedition to southeast Brazil between 1815–1817, from which the album Reise nach Brasilien, which first revealed to Europe real images of Brazilian Indians, was the ultimate result. It was translated into several languages and recognized as one of the greatest contributions to the knowledge of Brazil at the beginning of the nineteenth century. In 1832 he embarked on another expedition, this time to United States, together with the Swiss painter Karl Bodmer.
 
Prince Maximilian collected many examples of ethnography, and many specimens of flora and fauna of the area, still preserved in museum collections, notably in the Lindenmuseum, Stuttgart. The genus Neuwiedia Blume (Orchidaceae) was named for him. Also, Prince Maximilian is honored in the scientific names of eight species of reptiles: Hydromedusa maximiliani, Micrablepharis maximiliani, Bothrops neuwiedi, Polemon neuwiedi, Pseudoboa neuwiedi, Sibynomorphus neuwiedi, Xenodon neuwiedii, and Ramphotyphlops wiedii.

Biography
Wied was born in Neuwied, the grandson of the ruling count (after 1784 prince) Johann Friedrich Alexander of Wied-Neuwied. Born at the end of the European Enlightenment, Maximilian became friends with two of its major figures: Johann Friedrich Blumenbach, a major comparative anthropologist under whom he studied biological sciences, and Alexander von Humboldt, who served as Maximilian's mentor. He joined the Prussian army in 1800 during the Napoleonic Wars, rising to the rank of major. He was given a leave of absence from the army in 1815 (prior to Napoleon's escape from Elba).

Wied led an expedition to southeast Brazil from 1815 to 1817. In 1816 he found the tribe of the Botocudos, about which he gave exact details for the first time. On account of the war among the different tribes of the country he was obliged to abandon his original route and remained for some time near some ruins that he had come across. North of the Belmonte river he made his way through the woods, and after many difficulties arrived in the province of Minas Gerais. His delicate health forced him to abandon his expedition, and he was detained on unfounded suspicions for four days, and robbed of a large part of his collection of insects and plants. After this he resolved to leave the country, and embarked for Germany on 10 May 1817. On his return, he wrote Reise nach Brasilien (1820–21) and Beiträge zur Naturgeschichte von Brasilien (1825–33).

In 1832 he travelled to the Great Plains region of the United States, accompanied by the Swiss painter Karl Bodmer on a journey up the Missouri River, and wrote Reise in das Innere Nord-Amerikas (1840) on his return. During his travels, he was a sympathetic recorder of the cultures of many of the Native American tribes he encountered, notably the Mandan and the Hidatsa, who lived in settled villages on the banks of the Missouri, but also such nomadic peoples as the Sioux, Assiniboine, Plains Cree, Gros Ventres and Blackfoot. Bodmer's watercolour paintings of individuals, artefacts and customs among the Indians are acknowledged as among the most accurate and informative ever made. Many were adapted as hand-coloured engravings to illustrate the publication of 1840.

In 1845, he was elected as a member of the American Philosophical Society.

Gallery

See also
:Category:Taxa named by Prince Maximilian of Wied-Neuwied
Leopardus wiedii, a spotted cat named for Maximilian zu Wied-Neuwied
Helianthus maximiliani, the Maximilian sunflower

References

Further reading

 Maximilian zu Wied-Neuwied: Reise nach Brasilien in den Jahren 1815 bis 1817, 1820
 Maximilian zu Wied-Neuwied: Beiträge zur Naturgeschichte Brasiliens, 1824
 Maximilian zu Wied-Neuwied: Brasilien, Nachträge, Berichtigungen, Zusätze, 1850
 Maximilian zu Wied-Neuwied: Unveröffentlichte Bilder und Handschriften zur Völkerkunde Brasiliens. Editor: Josef Röder and Hermann Trimborn. Bonn 1954.
 Maximilian zu Wied-Neuwied: Maximilian Prince of Wied’s Travels in the Interior of North America, during the years 1832–1834. Achermann & Comp., London 1843–1844
 Maximilian zu Wied-Neuwied: Maximilian Prince of Wied’s Travels in the Interior of North America, during the years 1832–1834. In: Early Western Travels, 1748–1848, 1906, (vol. 22–25) from Reuben Gold Thwaites.
 David  C. Hunt, William J. Orr, W. H. Goetzmann (Editor): Karl Bodmer's America. Joslyn Art Museum, Omaha (Nebraska) 1984. 
 John C. Ewers: Views of vanishing frontier. Joslyn Art Museum, Omaha (Nebraska) 1984 + 1985
 Paul Schach, "Maximilian, Prince of Wied (1782-1867): Reconsidered." Great Plains Quarterly 14 (1994): 5-20.
 "Prince Maximilian of Wied-Neuwied," in Tom Taylor and Michael Taylor, Aves: A Survey of the Literature of Neotropical Ornithology, Baton Rouge: Louisiana State University Libraries, 2011.
 Marsha V. Gallagher: Karl Bodmer's eastern views. Joslyn Art Museum, Omaha (Nebraska) 1996
 Brandon K. Ruud (Editor): Karl Bodmer's North American Prints. Joslyn Art Museum, Omaha (Nebraska) 2004. 
 Michael G. Noll, “Prince Maximilian's Other Worlds.” The Pennsylvania Geographer, 43 (2005): 65–83.
 Michael G. Noll, "Prince Maximilian's America: The Narrated Landscapes of a German Explorer and Naturalist", Dissertation, University of Kansas, Lawrence (Kansas) 2000.
 Nordamerika Native Museum Zürich: Karl Bodmer. A Swiss Artist in America 1809–1893. Ein Schweizer Künstler in Amerika. University of Chicago Press and Scheidegger & Spiess, Zürich 2009 (English and German).

External links

Collection at Old Book Art All 81 aquatint illustrations and map from Maximilian Prince of Wied’s Travels in the Interior of North America, during the years 1832–1834
Prince Maximilian of Wied
Ein Prinz unter Indianern: Die Reisen des Prinz Maximilian zu Wied. Docudrama by Atlantis Film Berlin which aired on March 12, 2017, on Terra X, ZDF.
Maximilian zu Wied-Neuwied (1782–1867) naturalist, ethnologist
An Illustrated Expedition of North America: Bodmer and Maximilian in the American West
Plates from Prince Maximilian's Travels in Brazil (London, 1820)
Frogs and turtle named by Prince Max
 A Journey Through the Nebraska Region in 1833 and 1834: From the Diaries of Prince Maximilian of Wied
 
 

1782 births
1867 deaths
German ethnologists
German explorers of North America
German ornithologists
German taxonomists
19th-century German botanists
19th-century German zoologists
Explorers of South America
Honorary members of the Saint Petersburg Academy of Sciences
Maximilian Of Wied-Neuwied, Prince
People from Neuwied